In physics, Knudsen diffusion, named after Martin Knudsen, is a means of diffusion that occurs when the scale length of a system is comparable to or smaller than the mean free path of the particles involved. An example of this is in a long pore with a narrow diameter (2–50 nm) because molecules frequently collide with the pore wall.

Consider the diffusion of gas molecules through very small capillary pores. If the pore diameter is smaller than the mean free path of the diffusing gas molecules and the density of the gas is low, the gas molecules collide with the pore walls more frequently than with each other. This process is known as Knudsen flow or Knudsen diffusion.

The Knudsen number is a good measure of the relative importance of Knudsen diffusion. A Knudsen number much greater than one indicates Knudsen diffusion is important. In practice, Knudsen diffusion applies only to gases because the mean free path for molecules in the liquid state is very small, typically near the diameter of the molecule itself.

Mathematical description 
The diffusivity for Knudsen diffusion is obtained from the self-diffusion coefficient derived from the kinetic theory of gases:

For Knudsen diffusion, path length λ is replaced with pore diameter , as species A is now more likely to collide with the pore wall as opposed with another molecule. The Knudsen diffusivity for diffusing species A,  is thus

where  is the gas constant (8.3144 J/(mol·K) in SI units), molar mass  is expressed in units of kg/mol, and temperature T (in kelvins). Knudsen diffusivity  thus depends on the pore diameter, species molar mass and temperature. Expressed as a molecular flux, Knudsen diffusion follows the equation for Fick's first law of diffusion:

,

If the pore is relatively short, entrance effects can significantly reduce to net flux through the pore. Generally, the Knudsen process is significant only at low pressure and small pore diameter. However there may be instances where both Knudsen diffusion and molecular diffusion  are important. The effective diffusivity of species A in a binary mixture of A and B,  is determined by

For cases where α = 0 (i.e. countercurrent diffusion) or where  is close to zero, the equation reduces to

Knudsen self diffusion

In the Knudsen diffusion regime, the molecules do not interact with one another, so that they move in straight lines between points on the pore channel surface. Self-diffusivity is a measure of the translational mobility of individual molecules. Under conditions of thermodynamic equilibrium, a molecule is tagged and its trajectory followed over a long time. If the motion is diffusive, and in a medium without long-range correlations, the squared displacement of the molecule from its original position will eventually grow linearly with time (Einstein’s equation). To reduce statistical errors in simulations, the self-diffusivity, of a species is defined from ensemble averaging Einstein’s equation over a large enough number of molecules N.

See also
Knudsen flow
Knudsen equation
Atomic diffusion
Mass diffusivity

References

External links
 Knudsen number and diffusivity calculators

Diffusion